Back to the Future is an American science fiction comedy franchise created by Robert Zemeckis and Bob Gale. The franchise follows the adventures of a high school student, Marty McFly, and an eccentric scientist, Dr. Emmett "Doc" Brown, as they use a DeLorean time machine to time travel to different periods in the history of the fictional town of Hill Valley, California.

The first Back to the Future film was the highest-grossing film of 1985 and became an international phenomenon, leading to the second and third films, which were back-to-back film productions, released in 1989 and 1990, respectively. Though the sequels did not perform quite as well at the box office as the first film, the trilogy remains immensely popular and has yielded such spin-offs as an animated television series and a motion-simulation ride at the Universal Studios Theme Parks in Universal City, California; Orlando, Florida; and Osaka, Japan (all now closed), as well as a video game and a stage musical. The film's visual effects were done by Industrial Light and Magic. The first film won an Academy Award for Sound Editing.

Films

Back to the Future (1985) 

Seventeen-year-old Marty McFly is accidentally sent back in time from October 26, 1985, to November 5, 1955, in a time machine built from a DeLorean by eccentric scientist Emmett "Doc" Brown, when they are attacked and Doc is apparently killed by Libyan terrorists from whom he stole the plutonium that gives the flux capacitor the 1.21 gigawatts it needs to time-travel. Soon after his arrival in 1955, Marty's mother, Lorraine, falls in love with him, rather than with his father George McFly, threatening to cause a paradox that would result in Marty ceasing to exist. Without plutonium to power the time machine, Marty must find the 1955 Doc Brown to help him reunite his parents and return to 1985.

The efforts of Biff Tannen, George's bully and supervisor, further complicate Marty's situation until Marty successfully causes his parents to fall in love and simultaneously convinces George to finally stand up to Biff. Returning to the future via a lightning strike that powers the machine, Marty discovers a vastly improved situation for the McFly family, as a much more confident George has become an accomplished science fiction author, Marty's two older siblings have better lives, he owns the car of his dreams, and an apparently-softened Biff is now an auto detailer, rather than George's supervisor. Despite 1955 Doc's insistence on not knowing details of the future, a note Marty leaves in his pocket on November 12, 1955, prevents him from being killed by the terrorists. In the film's final moments, Doc Brown appears in a modified version of the DeLorean and tells Marty and his girlfriend Jennifer Parker that they must travel to the future to fix a problem caused by Marty and Jennifer's kids.

Back to the Future Part II (1989) 

The series continues as Doc Brown travels with Marty and Jennifer to the year 2015, where he has discovered Marty's family is in ruins. Shortly after rectifying the situation, Marty buys a sports almanac containing the outcomes of 50 years (1950–2000) worth of sporting events to make easy money. However, Doc talks him out of it and throws the almanac in the trash bin, where the 2015 Biff Tannen finds it. A sleeping Jennifer has been taken by police to her future home, needing Marty and Doc to retrieve her before returning to 1985. While Marty and Doc are at the 2015 McFly home, 2015 Biff steals the DeLorean time machine and gives the book to his 1955 self just before he goes to the dance at the end of the first film. When Doc and Marty return to 1985, they find that Biff has used the sports almanac's knowledge for financial gain, which allowed him to turn Courthouse Square into a casino with 27 floors, take over Hill Valley, get away with the murder of Marty's father, and later marry Marty's mother. Marty learns that Biff was given the book by 2015 Biff on November 12, 1955, so he and Doc go back to that date in order to steal the almanac from Biff before he can use it to destroy their lives. They accomplish this in a complex fashion, often crossing their own past selves' paths. When the duo is about to travel back to 1985, a lightning bolt strikes the DeLorean and activates the time circuits, sending Doc back to 1885 and leaving Marty stranded once again in 1955.

Back to the Future Part III (1990) 

After finding out that Doc Brown was trapped in 1885, Marty and the 1955 Doc find and fix the DeLorean. Learning that Doc gets shot in 1885 by Biff's great-grandfather, the outlaw Buford "Mad Dog" Tannen, Marty travels back in time to save Doc (who has become a blacksmith) and bring him back to the future. Arriving in the middle of a chase between the United States Cavalry and American Indians, Marty is forced to flee to a cave, discovering the DeLorean's fuel line is torn. Marty convinces Doc to come back with him and find a way to get back to his time before it is too late, but Doc is smitten after saving schoolteacher Clara Clayton. When the DeLorean appears in 1985, a modern train destroys it, with Marty barely escaping. Reuniting with Jennifer, Marty avoids a street race and the two visit the scene of the wreckage of the DeLorean. Suddenly, Doc, Clara and their children appear in a time-travelling steam locomotive. Doc reminds Marty and Jennifer that "[their] future is whatever [they] make it", so they must "make it a good one". The locomotive lifts off the tracks and departs from 1985, ending the trilogy.

Future 
Co-writer and director Robert Zemeckis, who has final rights to all films in the Back to the Future franchise, has stated that he will block all attempts to remake or reboot the original film. Co-writer Bob Gale commented that he did not wish to see another film in the series without the Marty McFly character nor any other actor than Michael J. Fox playing him, while acknowledging that Fox's current health condition would make this impossible. He illustrated this at a 2008 fan convention in Florida, stating: "The idea of making another Back to the Future movie without Michael J. Fox – you know, that's like saying, 'I'm going to cook you a steak dinner and I'm going to hold the beef. Gale also said that the Telltale video-game adaptation is the closest thing to what a fourth film could be like. In an interview on October 21, 2015, the day of Marty McFly's purported arrival in the future, Christopher Lloyd stated that he would consider making a fourth film under the condition that the original cast and creative team returned, along with a story "worth telling". The same day, Lloyd reprised his role as Doc Brown in a brief segment in which the character returns with a special message marking the 2015 date. In 2020, actor Tom Holland claimed in an interview with BBC Radio 1 that he was approached by an unnamed producer over a possible reboot of the franchise with him starring the lead role as Marty McFly (or a similarly new character). However, Holland stated that he was reluctant to take up this offer as he described the existing films as "perfect films", though he would be interested in re-creating scenes from the films in a deep-fake homage video or short film.

Short film

Doc Brown Saves the World (2015) 

Doc Brown Saves the World is a 2015 direct-to-video short film starring Christopher Lloyd as Emmett Brown. The short debuted on the 2015 Blu-ray and DVD release of the Back to the Future trilogy commemorating the franchise's 30th anniversary. The short was released on October 20, 2015.

Emmett Brown is in an undisclosed location outside Hill Valley, California. He sets a video camera to track his body in order to videotape a message for Marty McFly. He explains that it is October 21, 2015, one hour before Marty, Doc, and Jennifer Parker arrive from 1985. He explains that when he traveled to the future, he discovered that there was a nuclear holocaust that occurred on October 21, 2045. He tracked it down to four inventions: the food hydrator, self-lacing shoes, the hoverboard, and the Mr. Fusion home energy reactor.

The former three inventions led to the world becoming lazy and obese, leading to widespread waste. The invention of hoverboards led to hovercars, which led to people throwing their trash out of the windows, causing a great trash storm in 2021. All of this trash needed to be disposed of, which led to 100 million Mr. Fusion units being manufactured. All of the Mr. Fusion units had a tiny nuclear reactor inside, and all of them detonated on October 21, 2045. The chain of events that led to this happening began less than twenty-four hours after Marty caused Griff Tannen to crash his hoverboard into the Hill Valley Courthouse when Griff was sentenced. He vowed to get back at the world for laughing at him and planned to do it through a company that he would found, GriffTech.

Doc holds up a tablet computer with a digital version of the Hill Valley Telegraph. On June 13, 2032, GriffTech invented a social media network called ThingMeme, which secured funding from Douglas J. Needles. ThingMeme allowed inanimate objects to post selfies on the internet, but it was a scam, as it allowed Griff to gain access to every object on Earth. On the 30th anniversary of his arrest, on October 21, 2045, he uploaded a virus that was supposed to flash the word "butthead" on everything. However, it short-circuited the Mr. Fusion network, causing nuclear explosions in 100 million homes worldwide.

Doc Brown travels to an unknown date to ensure these inventions are never created, which will prevent the nuclear explosion. He leaves his camera on, which captures the inventions being erased from history. He arrives back in 2015, in a winter jacket and ski goggles, declaring that the mission was more complicated than he calculated, but declaring it a success. He holds up the tablet computer, where the headline on the Hill Valley Telegraph changes from "Griff Tannen Founds Grifftech" to "Griff Tannen Found Guilty".

Doc's excitement is short-lived, however, as he reaches in his pocket. He pulls out the Quantum Mind Jar, which he thought he disposed of in 2075. He is worried that not doing so will unravel everything they accomplished. The artificial intelligence of the Quantum Mind Jar tells Brown that they need to go back to the future, which he dismisses as he does not want to risk further time travel.

Another Emmett Brown then arrives, also declaring his experiment a success. Both versions of Brown, along with the artificial intelligence of the Quantum Mind Jar, are shocked at discovering that there are two Emmett Browns present.

Television

Back to the Future (1991–1992) 

An animated television series, Back to the Future: The Animated Series, lasted two seasons, each featuring 13 episodes, and ran on CBS from September 14, 1991, to December 26, 1992.

The TV series Back to the Future was an animated science-fiction comedy adventure television series for television, based on the live-action film trilogy. Although the series takes place after the films, creator Bob Gale stated that the animated series and the comic books take place in their own 'what if' and alternate timelines.

The show lasted two seasons, each featuring 13 episodes, and ran on CBS from September 14, 1991 to December 26, 1992 with reruns until August 14, 1993. The network chose not to renew the show for a third season (citing low ratings). It was later rerun on Fox, as a part of the FoxBox block, from March 22 to August 30, 2003. This show marked the debut television appearance of Bill Nye on a nationally broadcast show.

The central premise of the TV series was that, after the conclusion of Back to the Future Part III, in 1991, Dr. Emmett Brown moved into a farm in Hill Valley with his wife Clara, their sons Jules and Verne, and the family dog, Einstein. As with the films, time travel was achieved through the use of a modified DeLorean, which had apparently been re-built after it was destroyed at the end of the trilogy. The DeLorean now has voice-activated "time circuits" and can also travel instantaneously to different locations in space and time, in addition to folding into a suitcase. The characters also travel through time using the steam engine time machine Doc invented at the end of the third film.

Although Marty McFly is the show's main character and Jennifer Parker makes occasional appearances, the show focused primarily on the Brown family, whereas the films focused on the McFly family. The film's villain, Biff Tannen, also appeared frequently. In addition, relatives of McFly, Brown, and Tannen families were plentiful in the past or future parallel time zones visited. Unlike the films, which took place entirely in Hill Valley and the surrounding area, the series frequently took the characters to exotic locations. At the end of every episode, Doc Brown would appear to do an experiment, often related to the episode's plot. The first season also included post-credits segments with Biff Tannen telling a joke related to the episode, alluding to Thomas F. Wilson's career as a stand-up comedian.

Cast and crew

Cast and characters

Reception

Box office performance 

  indicates the adjusted totals based on current ticket prices (by Box Office Mojo).

, the Back to the Future series is the 14th-highest-grossing trilogy of all time at the domestic market (adjusted for inflation), 17th-highest-grossing trilogy of all time at the domestic market (not adjusted for inflation), and the 13th-highest-grossing trilogy of all time, worldwide (not adjusted for inflation).

The trilogy was re-released in certain countries worldwide on October 21, 2015, to commemorate the date traveled to by the protagonists in Back to the Future Part II and generated $4.8 million on its opening day. In the United States and Canada, it earned $1.65 million from ticket sales across 1,815 North American theaters on its opening day. Germany opened with $1.4 million and the United Kingdom with $345,000. Revenues from other territories such as Australia, Austria, France, Italy were moderate.

The first movie in the trilogy returned to certain countries once again for the 35th anniversary of the first film. In the United Kingdom, this was originally scheduled to begin on May 29, 2020, but due to the COVID-19 pandemic the opening dates of various cinemas were delayed, and on a cinema-by-cinema basis slowly reopened. Many cinemas also showed the rest of the trilogy, partially due to the coinciding 30th anniversary of Part III.

Critical and public response 

Marty McFly and Doc Brown were included in Empires 100 Greatest Movie Characters of All Time, ranking No. 39 and No. 76 respectively.

Cultural impact

Back to the Future Day 

October 21, 2015, the date used for the setting of the future events during the first act of the second film, has been called "Back to the Future Day" by the media. The year 2015 also commemorated the 30th anniversary of the release of the original film.

Many promotions were planned to mark the passing of the date, with many playing to the depiction of the future in the film, including:
 Universal Pictures created a trailer for Jaws 19, the fictional 3D film advertised in the future setting.
 Universal and Mattel produced an advertisement for the hoverboard seen in the film.
 Pepsi produced a limited run of the "Pepsi Perfect" soft drink, including the unique bottles, which sold out before October 21, 2015.
 The Ford Motor Company allowed users configuring a Ford Focus on their website to add a Flux Capacitor as a $1.2 million option.
 Nintendo released the game Wild Gunman, which Marty is seen playing in the Cafe '80s scene, on the Wii U's Virtual Console service.
 The October 22, 2015 edition of USA Today used a mock-front page which was a recreation of the one seen in the film on that date. The back of the mock page contains an advertisement for Jaws 19, as well as ads for the 30th anniversary Back to the Future box set and The Michael J. Fox Foundation. On the real front page, the USA Today blue dot is replaced with a drone camera like the one seen in the film. The print edition of this edition sold out in record time, according to USA Today.
 Nike revealed that they had recreated the Nike Mag shoes that Michael J. Fox wears in the film, complete with self-lacing power laces (a 2011 design was based on the same shoes, but lacked the power laces). Although the laces operated more slowly than those seen in the film, they were nonetheless shown to work as intended in an eight-second video featuring Fox wearing the shoes. Pairs of the shoes were sold via auction in 2016 to benefit The Michael J. Fox Foundation for Parkinson's Research.
 Toyota and Universal Pictures celebrated the 30th anniversary of the film series with a Toyota Tacoma Concept that was inspired by the original 1985 pickup that Toyota created for the 1985 film. The 2016 Tacoma 4WD was recreated using the same features and black color paint trim, KC HiLite driving lamps (modified with LED lighting), modified headlights and taillights (matching the 1985 version), the Toyota badging to the truck's tailgate, as well as the same D-4S fuel injection, the 1985-inspired mudflaps, and customized license plates matching the 2015 vehicles in Part II. The only difference between the 1985 original and the 2016 concept is the tires: Goodyear was featured in the 1985 film, while BF Goodrich is used on the concept. Toyota notes that this is a one-off concept as there are no plans to offer it as a package or level trim. Toyota also produced a promotional video starring Michael J. Fox and Christopher Lloyd and featuring many of the locations depicted in the film series, wherein the DeLorean's Mr. Fusion is used as a comparison for Toyota's hydrogen powered Mirai.
 Universal re-released all three films on DVD and Blu-ray disc on October 20, 2015.
 Telltale Games re-released their licensed Back to the Future the Game in a 30th Anniversary edition for newer consoles a week in advance of October 21. Several video games released downloadable content related to Back to the Future to coincide with October 21, 2015, including Rocket League and LittleBigPlanet 3.
 Back to the Future: The Ultimate Visual History is an officially licensed book which includes 224 pages of behind-the-scenes stories, interviews, rare and never-before-seen images, concept art, storyboards, photos, and special removable replicas of paper items from the films, written by Michael Klastorin with Randal Atamaniuk. The book was released on October 16, 2015.

Cast members appeared on Today and Jimmy Kimmel Live! on October 21, 2015. Nearly 2,000 theaters worldwide showed back-to-back screenings of the Back to the Future trilogy on October 21 and continuing through that weekend, which earned over $4.8M in single day ticket sales. Universal Studios offered location tours of the various filming locations around the date. The town of Reston, Virginia, temporarily changed its name to "Hill Valley" to commemorate the series during its annual film festival. Esquire Network aired the trilogy all day that day, plus all weekend.

Music

Home media box sets

2002 VHS and DVD release: "The Complete Trilogy" 
In July 1997, Universal Studios announced that Back to the Future would be one of their first ten releases on the new DVD format, though it ended up being delayed for five years. The films were released as a box set on VHS and DVD on December 17, 2002 in both widescreen (1.85:1) and full screen (1.33:1) formats. The widescreen DVDs had to be reissued a year later because of framing errors in converting from open matte to widescreen.

2010 DVD and Blu-ray release: "25th Anniversary Trilogy" 
In June 2008, a special screening of the trilogy was held in Celebration, Florida. Bob Gale told the crowd they were seeing the digitally remastered version that was going to be used for the Blu-ray version of the movies. The Blu-ray box set was released on October 26, 2010, and includes bonus features, such as a newly-produced six-part retrospective documentary titled Tales from the Future. There have been numerous complaints about the R1 packaging, leading to the release of an instruction sheet on how to safely remove and insert discs.

2015 DVD and Blu-ray release: "30th Anniversary Trilogy" 
On October 20, 2015, one day before the date of the fictional events transpiring in the 2015 segment of Part II, the trilogy was once again released on Blu-ray and DVD. A bonus disc was included, which featured new bonus material such as Outatime which is a look into the restoration of the time machine from 2012; Doc Brown Saves the World!, a new short movie starring Christopher Lloyd; two episodes from The Animated Series; two novelty commercials about "Jaws 19" and the "2015 Hoverboard"; and other additional features.

2020 Blu-ray and Ultra HD Blu-ray release: "The Ultimate Trilogy" 
A new set was released in October 2020 for The Ultimate Trilogy, to celebrate the franchise's 35th anniversary, and featured a release on Ultra HD Blu-ray for the first time. The set included a new digitally remastered 4K picture, Dolby Atmos sound, and more previously unreleased content.

Other media

Board and card games 
The Back to the Future: Back in Time board game was released in 2020. It is a fully cooperative game, in which each player is a character in the film, and must collect items to help Marty McFly and Doc to return from 1955 to their own time, as depicted in the first film in the trilogy.

In 2010, Looney Labs introduced Back to the Future: The Card Game, a strategy game using the same mechanics as the company's game Chrononauts. In the game, a timeline of cards are laid out in a grid with each era in the movies grouped together. Randomly distributed ID cards outline goals or timeline changes necessary to make sure the future character exists. The license for this game expired in 2012 and is no longer being produced.

Comic books 
A comic book series was published by Harvey Comics in 1992 detailing further adventures of the animated series. Only seven issues were produced. IDW published a mini-series which presents the first meeting of both Marty and Doc Brown and is written by co-screenwriter Bob Gale, which was released in stores on October 21, 2015, the same date that Marty travels with Doc Brown to the future depicted in the storyline for Part II. In issue #3, it was revealed that it had become an ongoing monthly comic due to popular demand.

Beginning in issue #6, the original format of one or two untold stories per issue was replaced with a multi-issue ongoing story arc. The original subtitle for the comic, "Untold Tales and Alternate Timelines", was used for the trade paperback which contained the first five comics in the series. The series has now gone on to what IDW calls "chapter 2" of the series with "Tales from the Time Train". This is a series of stories detailing where Doc and the Brown family went after time traveling at the end of Back to the Future Part III. Other mini-series published by IDW include "Citizen Brown", which adapts the Telltale video game, and "Biff to the Future", which depicts Biff Tannen's rise to power after being given the almanac by his future self. The latter is also co-written by Gale.

Transformers/Back to the Future is a four-issue crossover comic miniseries published by IDW Publishing, to commemorate the 35th anniversaries of Back to the Future and Hasbro's Transformers franchise. It was published from October 7, 2020, to May 12, 2021.

A Japanese light novel adaptation was announced in August 2021.

Books 
Each film in the trilogy also received a novelization that expanded on the movies by adding scenes, characters, and dialog, often culled from early-draft scripts.

In 2012, Hasslein Books released A Matter of Time: The Unauthorized Back to the Future Lexicon, written by Rich Handley. The book was released in cooperation with BTTF.com, the official Back to the Future website. A second volume, Back in Time: The Unauthorized Back to the Future Chronology, by Greg Mitchell and Rich Handley, was released in 2013.

Back to the Future: The Ultimate Visual History is an officially licensed book which includes 224 pages of behind-the-scenes stories, interviews, rare and never-before-seen images, concept art, storyboards, photos, and special removable replicas of paper items from the films. The book was written by Michael Klastorin, who was the production publicist on Back to the Future Part II and Part III, with Randal Atamaniuk. The book includes a foreword by Michael J. Fox, preface by Christopher Lloyd, introduction by Bob Gale and an afterword by Robert Zemeckis. It was released on October 16, 2015, to coincide with [[#Back to the Future Day|Back to the Future Day]], and was published by Titan Books in the UK and Harper Design in the US. It was reissued on November 3, 2020, with added contents, to commemorate the 35th anniversary of the trilogy.

 Video games 

Various video games based on the Back to the Future movies have been released over the years for home video game systems, including the Atari ST, ZX Spectrum, Commodore 64, Master System, Genesis, Nintendo Entertainment System, Super Famicom, Microsoft Windows, macOS, PlayStation 3, PlayStation 4, Wii, iOS, Xbox 360 and Xbox One platforms.Lego Dimensions (2015) features two Back to the Future-themed toy packs. The Level Pack adds a bonus level that adapts the events of the first film and includes a Marty McFly Minifigure, along with a constructible DeLorean and Hoverboard. The Fun Pack includes a Doc Brown Minifigure and a constructible Time Train from Part III. Both unlock access to an in-game open world set in Hill Valley. Michael J. Fox and Christopher Lloyd reprise their roles as Marty McFly and Emmett "Doc" Brown respectively. A downloadable content pack for Planet Coaster (2016), titled the Back to the Future Time Machine Construction Kit, includes customizable in-game replicas of the DeLorean time machine.

 Episodic video game Back to the Future: The Game (2010) was released from December 22, 2010, to June 23, 2011, developed and published by Telltale Games. The game is an episodic graphic adventure, and takes place in an alternate timeline based on the original trilogy. It was released as five episodes, with Christopher Lloyd reprising his role as Emmett "Doc" Brown, Claudia Wells reprising her role as Jennifer Parker, and Michael J. Fox making cameo appearances in the final episode. A. J. Locascio provided the voice for Marty McFly, and Bob Gale assisted with the script. Thomas Wilson reprised his role as Biff Tannen in the 2015 re-release.

The plot of the video game depicts Marty traveling back to 1931 to help Doc, who is in trouble again. The video game depicts several trips by Marty and Doc back and forth from 1931 to the present, due to multiple disruptions to the timeline. In several separate differing timelines, various altered outcomes are shown for the McFly family, and then separately for the entire Hill Valley region. At the conclusion of the game, the timeline is largely restored by Marty and Doc, although with some small differences from the "original" timeline.

 Pinball 

Two pinball adaptations of the film trilogy were released.  The first pinball adaptation was a physical one produced by Data East, available in 1990, and titled Back to the Future: The Pinball.  Over two decades later, Zen Studios developed and released a new, digital pinball adaptation in 2017, available as add-on content for Pinball FX 3 along with two other tables based on iconic classic films from Universal Pictures, Jaws and E.T. The Extra-Terrestrial. The latter table behaves differently than the original Data East version and features 3-D animated figures and visual effects that are impossible to reproduce on a physical table.

 Musical Back to the Future: The Musical is a stage musical with music and lyrics by Alan Silvestri and Glen Ballard, and a book by Robert Zemeckis and Bob Gale, adapted from their original screenplay. The show features original music alongside hits from the film, including "The Power of Love" and "Johnny B. Goode".

The musical originally was slated to make its world première in London's West End in 2015, the year to which the film trilogy's characters traveled in Part II. However, after director Jamie Lloyd left the production in August 2014, due to "creative differences" with Zemeckis, the production's release date was pushed to a 2016 opening. The show received its premiere at Manchester Opera House in February 2020 ahead of an expected West End transfer. The cast recording was initially set to be released on November 26, 2021, but was ultimately released on March 11, 2022.

A Broadway production is set to commence in 2023.

 Automotive commercials 
In 2015, Fox and Lloyd starred alongside popular YouTube science personality Go Tech Yourself in an extended Toyota commercial for Toyota's new fuel cell vehicle, the Mirai, entitled Fueled by the Future. The commercial doubled as a tribute to the franchise and illustrated how the idea of converting trash into fuel had become reality. The commercial was released on October 21—the same date to which Marty, Doc and Jennifer traveled in Back to the Future Part II.

 Theme park ride Back to the Future the Ride was a simulator ride based on and inspired by the Back to the Future films and is a mini-sequel to the 1990s Back to the Future Part III. The original attraction opened on May 2, 1991, at Universal Studios Florida. It also opened on June 2, 1993, at Universal Studios Hollywood and on March 31, 2001, at Universal Studios Japan. The rides in the United States have since been replaced by The Simpsons Ride. The ride in Japan remained operational until May 31, 2016.

 Documentaries 

In the fall of 2015, after a successful Kickstarter project, the Back in Time documentary film was released. The film features interviews with the members of the cast and crew along with the cultural impact of the trilogy 30 years later. In 2016, the OUTATIME: Saving the DeLorean Time Machine documentary film was released and presents the efforts of Bob Gale, Universal Studios, and a team of fans as they work to restore one of the original screen-used DeLorean time machines. Like the Back in Time documentary, OUTATIME was also successfully funded by a Kickstarter project. A 2021 documentary, titled Expedition: Back to the Future, featured Josh Gates and Christopher Lloyd searching for and restoring an original DeLorean used in the film, with appearances from several original cast members.

 Explanatory notes 

 References 

 External links 

 
 Interview with cast and director reunited on The Today Show'' for the 25th anniversary of the release of the first movie

 
1980s English-language films
1990s English-language films
1980s science fiction comedy films
1990s science fiction comedy films
American science fiction comedy films
American film series
American science fantasy films
Comedy film franchises
Film franchises introduced in 1985
Flying cars in fiction
Science fiction film franchises
Universal Pictures franchises